Lisa Perrotti-Brown is a wine critic, author and Master of Wine based in Napa, California. She reviews the wines of Bordeaux, Napa Valley and Sonoma County for The Wine Advocate and RobertParker.com, the independent wine publication and website founded by wine critic, Robert Parker. She is also the editor-in-chief for The Wine Advocate and RobertParker.com. As one of the world's authorities on wine, Perrotti-Brown has been interviewed on wine related topics by mainstream media such as the BBC and CNBC

Career 
Born in Maine, USA, Perrotti-Brown moved to London, UK in the early 1990s to become a playwright, having studied there during her junior year at Colby College. In 1992, she took a job as the manager of a wine bar in Pimlico. This kick-started her more than twenty-year stint in the wine trade, progressing through wine sales and marketing roles in the UK wine trade throughout the 1990s, before moving to Tokyo in 2002, where she worked as a wine buyer for a fine wine importer and a wine educator at Tokyo's Academie du Vin. In 2008, Perrotti-Brown moved to Singapore and began writing a column for Robert Parker's website, then known as eRobertParker.com. Later that year she achieved her Master of Wine (MW) qualification. In 2012, she became the editor-in-chief for Robert Parker Wine Advocate and RobertParker.com.

In 2015, Perrotti-Brown's first book, Taste Like a Wine Critic: A Guide to Understanding Wine Quality, was published. That year, she relocated to Napa, California, to set up the new USA office for Robert Parker Wine Advocate. Today, as well as being the editor-in-chief for RobertParker.com, she is the publication's critic for the wines of Bordeaux, Napa Valley and Sonoma County.

Education 
Perrotti-Brown graduated from Colby College, achieving a B.A. in English and Performing Arts in 1989. 

In 1998, she received her Diploma qualification from the Wine & Spirit Education Trust, London.

In 2008, Perrotti-Brown was awarded the Master of Wine qualification by the Institute of Masters of Wine in the United Kingdom.

Awards and recognitions 

 Recipient of the Masters of Wine Madame Bollinger Foundation Award.
 Recipient of the Masters of Wine Tim Derouet Foundation Award – the highest MW award given to a graduating MW who has excelled in every part of the exam.
 Ranked number 37 on IntoWine.com's "Top 100 Most Influential People in the U.S. Wine Industry", in 2018.

See also 
List of wine professionals

References 

Wine critics

Year of birth missing (living people)
Living people